The Jardin Paléobotanique is a botanical garden located in Les Millières, Soulce-Cernay, Doubs, Franche-Comté, France. The garden contains about 500 types of plants, including rare species and prehistoric trees such as Ginkgo biloba. It is open Sundays and holidays in the warmer months; an admission fee is charged.

See also 
 List of botanical gardens in France

References 
 Le Pays de Lomont: Soulce-Cernay
 FRACAS 2006, page 28
 France Tourisme Informations description (French)
 Tout de France entry (Dutch)
 France, le trésor des régions (French)

Gardens in Doubs
Botanical gardens in France